Javier Zamora (born 1990) is a Salvadoran American poet and activist.

Early life
Zamora was born in San Luis La Herradura, El Salvador and immigrated to the United States at the age of nine, joining his parents in California.

Education
He earned a BA at the University of California, Berkeley and an MFA at New York University and was a 2016–2018 Wallace Stegner Fellow at Stanford University.

Career
Zamora's chapbook Nueve Años Inmigrantes/Nine Immigrant Years won the 2011 Organic Weapon Arts Contest, and his first poetry collection, Unaccompanied, was published in 2017 by Copper Canyon Press. His poetry can be found in American Poetry Review, Best New Poets 2013, Kenyon Review, Narrative Magazine, The New Republic, The New York Times, Ploughshares, and Poetry.

Honors
Zamora's honors include Barnes & Noble Writer for Writer's Award (2016), Meridian Editors’ Prize, and the Ruth Lilly and Dorothy Sargent Rosenberg Poetry Fellowship from the Poetry Foundation. Zamora has received fellowships from the Bread Loaf Writers’ Conference, CantoMundo, Colgate University, The Frost Place, MacDowell Colony, The Macondo Writers Workshop, the Napa Valley Writers’ Conference, the National Endowment for the Arts Literature Fellowship in Creative Writing, and Yaddo. In 2017, Zamora was awarded the Narrative Prize for "Sonoran Song," "To the President-Elect," and "Thoughts on the Anniversary of My Crossing the Sonoran Desert".

Activism
Zamora was a founder, with poets Marcelo Hernandez Castillo and Christopher Soto (AKA Loma), of the Undocupoets campaign which eliminated citizenship requirements from major first poetry book prizes in the United States.

Books
 Nueve Años Inmigrantes/Nine Immigrant Years Organic Weapon Arts, 2012. ,  – chapbook
 Unaccompanied, Copper Canyon Press: Port Townsend, 2017. , 
 Solito: A Memoir, Hogarth Books: New York, 2022.

In Anthology
 Ghost Fishing: An Eco-Justice Poetry Anthology, University of Georgia Press, 2018. ,

References

External links

 Poetry and Profile at Poetry Foundation website
 Profile at Poets & Writers magazine
 "Sonoran Song and Other Poems" at Narrative Magazine.

Living people
1990 births
21st-century American poets
American male poets
American writers of Salvadoran descent
Hispanic and Latino American poets
Immigrant rights activists
New York University alumni
Poets from California
Salvadoran poets
Salvadoran male writers
Male poets
University of California, Berkeley alumni
21st-century American male writers
Stegner Fellows